The 2023 Chilean Primera División, known as Campeonato Betsson 2023 for sponsorship purposes, is the 93rd season of the Chilean Primera División, Chile's top-flight football league. The season began on 20 January and is scheduled to end on 10 December 2023.

Colo-Colo are the defending champions.

Teams

16 teams will take part in the league in this season: the top 14 teams from the 2022 tournament, plus the 2022 Primera B champions Magallanes and the winners of the promotion play-off Deportes Copiapó. The promoted teams replaced Deportes La Serena and Deportes Antofagasta, who were relegated to Primera B at the end of the 2022 season.

Stadia and locations

Notes

Personnel and kits

Managerial changes

Standings

Results

Top scorers

{| class="wikitable" border="1"
|-
! Rank
! Player
! Club
! Goals
|-
| align=center | 1
| Fernando Zampedri
|Universidad Católica
| align=center | 6
|-
| rowspan=2 align=center | 2
| Alexander Aravena
|Universidad Católica
| rowspan=2 align=center | 5
|-
| Leandro Garate
|Unión Española
|-
| rowspan=4 align=center | 4
| Diego Coelho
|Curicó Unido
| rowspan=4 align=center | 4
|-
| Misael Dávila
|Palestino
|-
| Gastón Lezcano
|Cobresal
|-
| Cris Martínez
|Huachipato
|}

Source: Soccerway

See also
2023 Primera B de Chile
2023 Copa Chile 
2023 Supercopa de Chile

References

External links
Primera División on ANFP's website 

Chile
1
Primera División de Chile seasons
Chile